Tanzania Tea Packers, also known as Tatepa Limited, is a company based in Mbeya, Tanzania, which grows and exports tea products, as well as other produce including fruits.

The company is listed on the Dar es Salaam Stock Exchange.

References

Agriculture in Tanzania
Tea companies
Companies listed on the Dar es Salaam Stock Exchange
Mbeya